The 2022 New Hampshire Senate elections took place as part of the biennial 2022 United States elections. New Hampshire voters elected state senators in all of the state's 24 senate districts. State senators serve two-year terms in the New Hampshire Senate, with all of the seats up for election each cycle. The primary elections held on September 13, 2022, determined which candidates would appear on the November 8, 2022, general election ballot.

Composition

Summary

Close races

Outgoing incumbents

Retiring
Erin Hennessey (R-Littleton), representing District 1 since 2020, is retiring.
Bob Giuda (R-Warren), representing District 2 since 2016, is retiring.
Harold F. French (R-Franklin), representing District 7 since 2016, is retiring.
Jay Kahn (D-Keene), representing District 10 since 2016, is retiring.
John Reagan (R-Deerfield), representing District 17 since 2012, is retiring.

Seeking another office
Kevin Cavanaugh (D-Manchester), representing District 16 since 2017, is not seeking reelection to the Senate in order to run for Executive Council in the 4th district.
Chuck Morse (R–Salem), representing District 22 since 2010, is not seeking reelection to the Senate in order to run for U.S. Senate.
Tom Sherman (D-Rye), representing District 24 since 2018, is not seeking reelection to the Senate in order to run for governor.

Districts

District 1

Candidates
Republican
Carrie Gendreau, selectwoman for Littleton since 2018

Democratic
Edith Tucker, incumbent state representative for Coos District 5 since 2016

Results
General election

District 2

Candidates
Republican
Timothy Lang Sr., incumbent state representative for Belknap District 4 since 2016
John Plumer, former state representative
Dave DeVoy, Republican candidate in 2020
Democratic
Kate Miller, former Democratic state representative (2008-2010)

District 3

Candidates
Republican
Nancy Cunning
Democratic
William Marsh, incumbent state representative for Carroll District 8 since 2016

District 4

Candidates
Republican
Seamus Casey, candidate for state representative in 2014 and 2016
Democratic
David H. Watters, incumbent state senator since 2012, previously served two terms in the N.H. House of Representatives for Strafford District 4

Results
General election

District 5

Candidates
Republican
John McIntyre
Democratic
Suzanne Prentiss, incumbent state senator since 2020, former mayor of Lebanon (2017-2019) and Lebanon city councilor since 2009

Results
General election

District 6

Candidates
Republican
James Gray, incumbent state senator since 2016
Democratic
Ruth Larson, candidate for state representative in 2018 and 2020

Results
General election

District 7

Candidates
Republican
Thomas Dunne Jr., candidate for state representative in 2016, 2018 and 2020
Dan Innis, former state senator for District 24 (2016-2018)
Democratic
Richard Lobban Jr., candidate for Grafton District 9 in 2020

District 8

Candidates
Republican
Ruth Ward, incumbent state senator since 2016
Democratic
Charlene Lovett, former non-partisan mayor of Claremont (2016-2021) and former Republican state representative for Sullivan District 4 (2010-2012)

Results
General election

District 9

Candidates
Republican
Denise Ricciardi, incumbent state senator since 2020
Democratic
Matthew McLaughlin

Results
General election

District 10

Candidates
Republican
Ian Freeman, syndicated talk radio host
Sly Karasinski, candidate for Cheshire District 12 in 2020
Democratic
Donovan Fenton, incumbent state representative for Cheshire District 8 since 2016
Bobby Williams, Keene city councilor

District 11

Candidates
Republican
Gary Daniels, incumbent state senator since 2020 (previously served 2014–2018)
John Frechette
Democratic
Shannon Chandley, former state senator (2018-2020)

District 12

Candidates
Republican
Kevin Avard, incumbent state senator since 2020 (previously served 2014–2018)
Democratic
Melanie Levesque, former state senator (2018-2020)

Results
General election

District 13

Candidates
Republican
Daniel J. Paul
Stephen Scaer
Democratic
Cindy Rosenwald, incumbent state senator since 2018

District 14

Candidates
Republican
Sharon Carson, incumbent state senator since 2008
Democratic
John Robinson

Results
General election

District 15

Candidates
Republican
Linda Rae Banfil
Democratic
Becky Whitley, incumbent state senator since 2020

Results
General election

District 16

Candidates
Republican
Barbara Griffin, incumbent state representative for Hillsborough District 6 since 2014
Michael Yakubovich, incumbent state representative for Merrimack District 24 since 2018
Democratic

 June Trisciani, Manchester Alderman At-large since 2021

District 17

Candidates
Republican
Scott R. Bryer
Howard Pearl, incumbent representative for Merrimack District 26 since 2016
Democratic
Christine M. Tappan

District 18

Candidates
Republican
George Lambert, former state representative for Hillsborough District 44 (2010-2014), former candidate for Governor in 2014 and candidate for District 18 in 2018.
Ross Terrio, former state representative for Hillsborough District 14 from 2010 to 2012 and former member of the Manchester Board of School Committee from 2013 to 2020
Democratic
Donna Soucy, incumbent state senator since 2012

District 19

Candidates
Republican
Regina Birdsell, incumbent state senator since 2014

Results
General election

District 20

Candidates
Republican
Richard H. Girard, former member of the Manchester Board of School Committee (2015–2020) and former alderman Manchester Board of Mayor and Aldermen (1998–2000)
Democratic
Lou D'Allesandro, incumbent state senator since 1998

Results
General election

District 21

Candidates
Democratic
Rebecca Perkins Kwoka, incumbent state senator since 2020

Results
General election

District 22

Candidates
Republican
Daryl Abbas, incumbent state representative for Rockingham District 8 since 2018
Peter Torosian, incumbent state representative for Rockingham District 14 since 2016
Democratic
Wayne Haubner

District 23

Candidates
Republican
Bill Gannon, incumbent state senator since 2020 (previously served 2016–2018)

Democratic
Brenda Oldak

Results
General election

District 24

Candidates
Republican
Lou Gargiulo, former state representative (1992–1996)
Democratic
Debra Altschiller, incumbent state representative for Rockingham District 19 since 2016

Results
General election

See also
 2022 New Hampshire elections
 2022 United States elections
 New Hampshire Senate
 Elections in New Hampshire

References

External links
 
 
  (State affiliate of the U.S. League of Women Voters)
 

Senate
New Hampshire Senate elections
New Hampshire Senate